Paciano Rizal is an urban barangay comprising in Calamba, Laguna, in the Philippines. It is the fifth most important barangay in Calamba.  It is situated to the west of San Cristobal, to the east of Mayapa, to the north of Lawa and south of Mapagong. The barangay Paciano Rizal of Calamba named by the people of Paciano Rizal an older brother of José Rizal. Paciano Rizal was born in this barangay.

Major Establishments 
 Checkpoint Mall (Metro Mall Calamba)
 Jollibee - Checkpoint, Paciano Rizal
 Chowking - Checkpoint, Paciano Rizal
 McDonald's - Checkpoint, Paciano Rizal
 Shakey's Pizza Restaurant - Checkpoint, Paciano Rizal
 Greenwich Pizza Restaurant - Checkpoint Mall, Paciano Rizal
 Max's Restaurant - Checkpoint Mall, Paciano Rizal
 Atoy's Pork Chop Restaurant - Checkpoint, Paciano Rizal
 Czyrah's Pizza Parlor
 Luzon Development Bank Corporate Center
 Banco de Oro - Checkpoint, Paciano Rizal
 The Rural Bank of Tiaong, Inc.
 Bank of the Philippine Islands (BPI) Checkpoint Branch
 Luzon Development Bank (LDB)
 RCBC Business Center
 Rosario Business Center
 Eastwest Bank
 Pase Uno de Calamba - Checkpoint, Paciano Rizal
 Pan de Manila - Checkpoint, Paciano Rizal
 Foton Calamba
 University of Perpetual Help System Dalta Calamba Campus

Other Fastfoods and Restaurants 
 Inandang Tiburcio
 Inandang Inihaw na Manok, Liempo at sisig
 Avelis Bulalo
 Angel's Hamburger
 Cassy Duran Lecho de Cebu
 Yammy Tea Cafe
 Don Kanin
 Baker's Room
 G. D. Bakery
 Don Benito's Cassava
 Bingo's Bakery
 Joymar Sulit Merienda
 Siomai King
 Manila Eatery
 Porksipu
 Andre Meals
 Samgyeopsal
 Emir's Cafe
 Tearamen
 Tweetea Cups
 Ate Tess Lugawan
 3P's Eatery
 Bean There Drunk That
 Mel Foodshop
 Angel's Eatery
 Poolzone Garden
 West Orient Bakery
 Dominic's Bakery
 Ianah Bakery
 Baldo's Chickem Bucket
 Shane and Faith Eatery
 Jess Lomi Hawz
 Dada's Lechon
 Andre Grill
 Eljay's Pasalubong Center (Foods)
 VJ Batangas Lomi House
 Guys and Dolls Restaurant & Coffee Shop
 The Original Colettes
 Jocab's Pansit Batil
 Goring Eatery

Industrial Companies 
 Asian Terminals Inc.
 Fullertec Manufacturing Inc.
 Diamond Precise Toolings Corp.
 First Asian Service Technology
 Recycle Plus Inc.
 Renaissance Industrial Sales
 Hi-Lon Manufacturing Company, Inc.
 Phytos Technology Philippines Inc.
 Sagara Metro Plastics Industrial Corp.

Government Agencies 
 Office of Civil Defense (OCD) CALABARZON Regional Office
 National Conciliation and Mediation Board (NCMB) CALABARZON Regional Office
 Philhealth Calamba Service Office

Sitios, Puroks, and Subdivisions
Paciano Rizal is divided into 4 sitios, 3 puroks, and 10 subdivisions.
Centerville
Checkpoint
Dona Felisa
Marivel Subdivision
Modern Village
Morales
Villa Rizza
Purok V
Purok VI
Purok VI Extension
Rizal Village
San Antonio
Sitio Ilaya
Sitio Maligaya
Sitio Riverside
Sitio Manggahan
St. Christopher I

Demography

Geography
Location:
 Paciano Rizal, Calamba

References

External links
 Official Website of the Provincial Government of Laguna

Barangays of Calamba, Laguna